The shortlists for the 2022 CONCACAF Awards were announced on 17 March 2023.

Men's football awards

Player of the Year

Women's football awards

Player of the Year

References

CONCACAF trophies and awards
Awards
CONCACAF